Cranoglanis multiradiatus is a species of armorhead catfish found in China with questionable records from Vietnam.

This species reaches a length of  SL.

References 

 

Catfish of Asia
Freshwater fish of China
Fish described in 1926